The 1933 Massachusetts State Aggies football team represented Massachusetts State College in the 1933 college football season. The team was coached by Mel Taube and played its home games at Alumni Field in Amherst, Massachusetts. Mass State finished the season with a record of 5–3.

Schedule

References

Massachusetts State
UMass Minutemen football seasons
Massachusetts State Aggies football